Major Benjamin Handley Geary VC (29 June 1891 – 26 May 1976) was a British Army recipient of the Victoria Cross, the highest and most prestigious award for gallantry in the face of the enemy that can be awarded to British and Commonwealth forces.

Early life
Geary was educated at Dulwich College Preparatory School and St Edmund's School, Canterbury, then went up to Keble College, Oxford, in 1910. After graduating he taught at Forest School in Walthamstow (then in Essex, now absorbed into Greater London) 1913–14. On the outbreak of World War I he was commissioned into the Special Reserve on 15 August 1914 as a second lieutenant in the 4th Battalion, East Surrey Regiment. Soon afterwards he was sent to France and attached to the regular 1st Battalion serving on the Western Front.

VC
On 20 and 21 April 1915 the 1st Battalion was in action on Hill 60 near Ypres. Second Lieutenant Geary led his men across exposed open ground swept by fierce enemy fire to join survivors of the Bedfordshire Regiment in a crater at the top of the hill. Geary's subsequent actions earned him the VC. The citation reads:

Later life
Geary was evacuated to England having been shot in the head and lost the sight in his left eye; his right eye was also seriously impaired. He was promoted to lieutenant, worked on ground duties with the Royal Flying Corps, returned to France (still with the RFC) in 1916 and was appointed acting captain. In January 1918 he rejoined the 1st Battalion East Surrey Regiment in Italy, still as acting captain, and commanded a company although medically he should not have returned to active duty. Later that year he returned to France and was wounded again. He retired from Army in 1919 with the rank of captain.

Geary took Holy Orders in the Church of England, having studied at Wycliffe Hall, Oxford, and after other Church posts served as Chaplain to the Forces 1926–27. He then resigned and emigrated to Canada. During World War II he served with the Canadian Army and achieved the rank of Major. After the war he was Sergeant-at-Arms of the Ontario Legislature 1947–71, then retired but was for a time historian for the Legislature. His grave and memorial are at St Mark's Church Cemetery, Niagara-on-the-Lake, Ontario.

The medal
Geary's Victoria Cross and other medals are displayed at the Canadian War Museum in Ottawa, Ontario, Canada.

References

Monuments to Courage (David Harvey, 1999)
The Register of the Victoria Cross (This England, 1997)
VCs of the First World War - The Western Front 1915 (Peter F. Batchelor & Christopher Matson, 1999)

External links
Geary's Medals at the Canadian War Museum
Geary's biography at Keble College's website
Account of his VC action, Queen's Royal Surrey Regiment

British World War I recipients of the Victoria Cross
British Army personnel of World War I
East Surrey Regiment officers
1891 births
1976 deaths
Canadian Army officers
English emigrants to Canada
People educated at St Edmund's School Canterbury
People from Marylebone
Canadian military personnel of World War II
Royal Army Chaplains' Department officers
British Army recipients of the Victoria Cross
Alumni of Keble College, Oxford
Alumni of Wycliffe Hall, Oxford
20th-century English Anglican priests